The Maldivian Second Division Football Tournament is a football league tournament in the Maldives, organized by the Football Association of Maldives.

A new structure for the Second Division Football Tournament was introduced for the 2015 season.

Structure
Changes were brought to the second division league structure 23 December 2014, by the FAM's FIFA normalizing committee.

The division now consists of 10 clubs and two rounds are played. All teams play against each other once in the first round and the top five clubs will be qualified for the second round. These 5 clubs play against each other once and the club with most points is declared as champion, and promoted to the Dhivehi Premier League. Runner up will be qualified for the play-off match between the Dhivehi Premier League 9th position team for a spot in the next season's Premier League. The bottom two teams (9th and 10th) are relegated to the third division.

Teams
A total of 10 teams contest in the league, including two promoted from the third division, one relegated from premier league, and the winner of the play-off between premier league 7th and second division 2nd sides.

On 11 February 2015, the Football Association of Maldives announced that from 2015 season on wards, Maldives national under-19 football team will compete in the second division.

Winners
2007: Club All Youth Linkage
2008: Red Line Club
2009: Vyansa
2010: Dhivehi Sifainge Club
2011: Hurriyya Sports Club
2012: BG Sports Club
2013: Sports Club Mecano
2014: TC Sports Club
2015: United Victory
2016: Club Green Streets
2017: Club Zefrol
2018: Da Grande Sports Club
2019: Not held
2020: Club Valencia

See also
List of football clubs in Maldives

References

  
2
Second level football leagues in Asia